FC ADOMS Kremenchuk was a Ukrainian football club from Kremenchuk, Poltava Oblast.

League and cup history

{|class="wikitable"
|-bgcolor="#efefef"
! Season
! Div.
! Pos.
! Pl.
! W
! D
! L
! GS
! GA
! P
!Domestic Cup
!colspan=2|Europe
!Notes
|}

 
ADOMS Kremenchuk, FC
Football clubs in Kremenchuk
Association football clubs established in 1998
Association football clubs disestablished in 2001
1998 establishments in Ukraine
2001 disestablishments in Ukraine